Jurupa Unified School District is grade K-12 school district in Riverside County, California. It has an enrollment of approximately 20,500 students.
The geographic location of the Jurupa area is the upper western corner of Riverside County, California, north and west of the Santa Ana River and south of the San Bernardino-Riverside County line.  The Superintendent is Elliott Duchon.

District Mission Statement
The mission of the Jurupa Unified School District is to educate each student to the highest levels of academic achievement and prepare students to succeed in life.

Schools

High schools 
 Jurupa Valley High School
 Nueva Vista Continuation High School
 Patriot High School
 Rubidoux High School
 The Learning Center

Middle schools 
 Del Sol Academy
Jurupa Middle School
 Mission Middle School
 Mira Loma Middle School

Elementary schools 
 Camino Real Elementary School
Del Sol Academy
 Glen Avon Elementary School
 Granite Hill Elementary School
 Ina Arbuckle Elementary School
 Indian Hills Elementary School
 Mission Bell Elementary School
 Pacific Avenue Elementary School
 Pedley Elementary School
 Peralta Elementary School
 Rustic Lane Elementary School
 Sky Country Elementary School
 Stone Avenue Elementary School
 Sunnyslope Elementary School
 Troth Street Elementary School
 Van Buren Elementary School
 West Riverside Elementary School

See also
List of Riverside County, California, placename etymologies#Jurupa

Notes

External links
 

Jurupa Valley, California
School districts in Riverside County, California